Samrajyam is a 1990 Indian Malayalam-language gangster film directed by Jomon. The film stars Mammootty as Alexander, a powerful underworld don. The film narrates the story of his rise and fall. The film features Madhu, Srividya, Ashokan, Captain Raju and Vijayaraghavan in supporting roles. The film features original music composed by Ilaiyaraaja, while the cinematography was handled by Jaynan Vincent. The film was a major commercial success and ran for more than 200 days in Kerala. The film found greater success in Andhra Pradesh. The film brought by distributor for about 10 prints went on to play in 400 prints due to the huge demand in theatres. This movie sequel of 2015 movie Samrajyam II: Son of Alexander

Premise
Alexander, a powerful mafia leader, faces several trials and tribulations while trying to juggle his estranged relationship with his policeman father Balakrishnan and rule the underworld.

Cast

Production 
Speaking on a interview with Mathrubhumi in 2020, on how he developed the story for Samrajyam, Jomon said he had always wanted make a film on organized crime and mafia, based on real-life incidents. He had always been fasicinated in it from his childhood. He began working as an associate director to I. V. Sasi in the late 1980s. He was the sixth assistant director to Sasi in 1921 (1988). During shooting breaks, he narrated a thread he had in mind to Mammootty. Impressed, Mammootty asked him to develop it into a story. He then devoleped a story which he narrated to Mammootty and Joshiy on the sets of Mahayanam (1989). Joshiy felt the story was "interesting" and asked him to develop a script. In an interview he said: After that I started screenwriting while staying at the lodge in Madras. A month later, when Mammooka arrived at the Woodlands Hotel in Madras, I went and met him with the written script. After reading it in one sitting, Mammootty said, “It lacks an experienced screenwriter. Let me introduce someone. Let him write the script."

Release

Reception 
The film received positive reviews from critics and was praised for its direction and effects.

Box office
The film was a major commercial success at the Kerala and Andhra Pradesh box office. The film ran over 200 days in Kerala and 600 days in Andhra Pradesh box office. The film remains to be the longest running Malayalam film in Andhra Pradesh, It ran for more than 400 days in multiple centers in AP and even crossed the 600 day mark in some theatres.

Sequel
Samrajyam II: Son of Alexander starring Unni Mukundan in the lead was released in 2015. The movie was the debut Malayalam venture of Tamil director Perarasu. Twenty five years from the original, this sequel tells the story of Alexander's son.

References

External links
 

1990 films
1990s Malayalam-language films
Indian gangster films
Films scored by Ilaiyaraaja
Jyam1
1990 directorial debut films